Made In Australia is an Australian feature film released in 2013. Filmed in Melbourne, Australia and Hong Kong on a microbudget. It was awarded 'Best Guerrilla Film' at the 14th Melbourne Underground Film Festival One of the film's core themes is the perception of Asian masculinity in the West. The film is one of the only Australian features to show full-frontal Asian male nudity in film, with the title credits "Made In Australia" appearing over Matthew Victor Pastor's genitalia.

Asian-Australian identity

References

External links

2013 films
Australian drama films
2010s English-language films
2010s Australian films